The term chief pastor refers to the pastor with the highest authority or position in The Pentecostal Mission, also known as the New Testament Church in the Middle East and a few other countries, who oversees the ministers and ministries of the church worldwide.  The church was established as the Ceylon Pentecostal Mission and is known by this name presently in Sri Lanka.

List of Chief Pastors of The Pentecostal Mission
  1. Pas. Paul Ramankutty (1923–1945)
  2. Pas. Alwin R. de Alwis (1945–1962)
  3. Pas. T. Fredrick Paul (1962–1973)
  4. Pas. A. C. Thomas (1973–1976)
  5. Pas. Jacob Ratnasingham (1976–1990)
  6. Pas. V. G. Samuel (1990–1991)
  7. Pas. H. Ernest Paul (1991–1994)
  8. Pas. C. K. Lazarus (1994–1999)
  9. Pas. P. M. Thomas (1999–2001)
  10. Pas. T. U. Thomas (2001–2006)
  11. Pas. F. Wilson Joseph (2006–2014)
  12. Pas. Wesley Peter (2014–2015)
  13. Pas. Stephen Natarajan (2015-2018)
  14. Pas. Abraham Mathew (2018–Present)

Associate or Deputy chief Pastors
Pas. C. John (1973–1977)
Pas. S.B. Earnest (1977–1987)
Pas. Silas Kajandere  
Pas. Philip Chandapillai (1977–1984)
Pas. T. Geevarghese (1984–1986)
Pas. Don M. Spiers (1987–2004)
Pas. A. Joy Fitch (2004-2006)
Pas. Wesley Peter (2006-2014)

Pas. G. Jayam (2014-Present)
Pas. M.T. Thomas (2018–Present).

References

 The Pentecostal Mission Paramakudi Centre

Chief Pastors of the Pentecostal Mission